William Mann may refer to:

William Mann (MP), English politician in the House of Commons from 1621 to 1625
William Mann (1610–1650), original settler of Providence, Rhode Island
William Abram Mann (1854–1934), general officer in the United States Army
William d'Alton Mann (1839–1920), American Civil War soldier and newspaper and magazine publisher
William C. Mann "Bill" (died 2004), computational linguist
William Edward George Mann (1899–1966), senior Royal Air Force officer and flying ace
William "Billy" H. Mann, record producer/singer/songwriter
William Hodges Mann (1843–1927), American politician
William Horace Mann (1878–1938), English cricketer
William J. Mann, American author and gay historian
William Joseph Mann (1875–1951), Australian politician
William Julius Mann (1819–1892), U.S. Lutheran theologian and author
William M. Mann (1886–1960), entomologist and director of the National Zoo, Washington, D.C., 1925-1956
William Robert Mann (1920–2006), American mathematician
William Somervell Mann (1924–1989), British music critic for The Times

See also  
Mann (surname)